José "Pepe" Biondi (born Buenos Aires, September 4, 1909 - died Buenos Aires, October 4, 1975) was an Argentine comedian, acrobat and variety artist who worked in the circus, theater, film and television. For both critics and the public, Biondi was one of the greatest Argentine comedians, who stood out for his innocent and clownish humor.

References

Argentine comedians

es:Pepe Biondi